In British politics, an affiliated trade union is one that is linked to the Labour Party. The party was created by the trade unions and socialist societies in 1900 as the Labour Representation Committee and the unions have retained close institutional links with it.

Affiliated unions pay an annual fee to the Labour Party; in return, they elect thirteen of the thirty-nine members of Labour's National Executive Committee and fifty per cent of the delegates to Labour Party Conference. Local union branches also affiliate to Constituency Labour Parties and their members who are also individual members of the Party may represent the union as delegates on Labour Party structures.

Individual members may opt out of paying into a union's political fund which is used to finance the affiliation.

Since 1994, affiliated trade unions have organised themselves into TULO - The Trade Union & Labour Party Liaison Organisation, with a small number of staff to manage the relationship between the unions and the Party. A national TULO committee, with the unions' general secretaries, the Party Leader and Deputy Leader, General Secretary and NEC Chair and MPs' representatives, meets regularly to co-ordinate work and policy.

Until 1995, each union exercised a block vote at party conferences; since then, multiple delegates of a single union get an equal share of its voting allocation.

Affiliated unions
As of October 2021, the trade unions affiliated to the Labour Party are:

Associated Society of Locomotive Engineers and Firemen (ASLEF)
Community (formerly KFAT & ISTC)
Communication Workers Union (CWU)
Fire Brigades Union (FBU)
GMB
Musicians Union (MU)
National Union of Mineworkers (NUM)
Transport Salaried Staffs' Association (TSSA)
UNISON (The Public Services Union)
Unite (general workers in public and private sectors)
Union of Shop, Distributive and Allied Workers (USDAW)

The General Federation of Trade Unions (GFTU) represents its members, seven of the smaller unions, on many of the committees if they cannot send a delegate. In 2015, Unity merged into the GMB. In January 2017, the Broadcasting, Entertainment, Cinematograph and Theatre Union (BECTU) merged with Prospect, a trade union that represents certain grades in the civil service and other professionals. Because Prospect represents civil servants, they are politically neutral and so BECTU disaffiliated from the Labour Party as a condition of the merger. In January 2017, the Union of Construction, Allied Trades and Technicians (UCATT) merged into Unite.

Former affiliates
During Tony Blair's leadership of the Labour Party, the National Union of Rail, Maritime and Transport Workers and Fire Brigades Union severed their links. However, the Fire Brigades Union re-affiliated to the Labour Party in November 2015. In September 2021 the Bakers, Food and Allied Workers' Union, one of the founding unions of the party, announced its disaffiliation from the party, citing dissatisfaction with Keir Starmer's leadership.

Formerly, there were many more small trade unions in the UK, and many of them affiliated to the Labour Party. In 1946, the affiliates were:

 Amalgamated Engineering Union
 Amalgamated Society of Journeymen Felt Hatters
 Amalgamated Society of Shuttlemakers
 Amalgamated Society of Textile Workers and Kindred Trades
 Amalgamated Union of Building Trade Workers of Great Britain and Ireland
 Amalgamated Union of Operative Bakers, Confectioners and Allied Workers
 Amalgamated Union of Upholsterers
 Associated Blacksmiths', Forge and Smithy Workers' Society
 Associated Society of Locomotive Engineers and Firemen
 Association of Cine-Technicians
 Association of Correctors of the Press
 Association of Engineering and Shipbuilding Draughtsmen
 Boilermakers' and Iron and Steel Shipbuilders' Society
 Cardiff, Penarth and Barry Coal Trimmers' Union
 Confederation of Health Service Employees
 Constructional Engineering Union
 Clerical and Administrative Workers' Union
 Electrical Trades Union
 Enginemen and Firemen's Union
 Fire Brigades' Union
 General Iron Fitters' Association
 Iron and Steel Trades Confederation
 Ironfounding Workers' Association
 London Society of Compositors
 National Amalgamated Furnishing Trades' Association
 National Amalgamated Union of Life Assurance Workers
 National Amalgamated Union of Shop Assistants, Warehousemen and Clerks
 National Association of Operative Plasterers
 National Cutlery Union
 National League of the Blind
 National Society of Coppersmiths, Braziers and Metal Workers
 National Society of Metal Mechanics
 National Society of Operative Printers and Assistants
 National Society of Painters
 National Society of Pottery Workers
 National Union of Agricultural Workers
 National Union of Blastfurnacemen, Ore Miners, Coke Workers and Kindred Trades
 National Union of Boot and Shoe Operatives
 National Union of Cigarette Makers and Tobacco Workers
 National Union of Distributive and Allied Workers
 National Union of Dyers, Bleachers and Textile Workers
 National Union of Electrotypers and Stereotypers
 National Union of Foundry Workers
 National Union of General and Municipal Workers
 National Union of Gold, Silver and Allied Trades
 National Union of Mineworkers
 National Union of Public Employees
 National Union of Railwaymen
 National Union of Seamen
 National Union of Shale Miners and Oil Workers
 National Union of Stove, Grate, and General Metal Workers
 National Union of Tailors and Garment Workers
 National Union of Vehicle Builders
 National Woolsorters' Society
 Power Loom Carpet Weavers' and Textile Workers' Association
 Prudential Staff Union
 Railway Clerks' Association
 Scottish Painters' Society
 Scottish Union of Bakers and Confectioners
 Ship Constructors' and Shipwrights' Association
 Society of Lithographic Artists, Designers, Engravers and Process Workers
 Transport and General Workers' Union
 Typographical Association
 United French Polishers' Society
 United Patternmakers' Association
 United Textile Factory Workers' Association
 Waterproof Garment Workers' Trade Union
 Yorkshire Warptwisters' Society

See also
Trades Union Congress
Political funding in the United Kingdom
Trade Union and Labour Party Liaison Organisation
Socialist society (Labour Party)

References

External links
TULO - Unions Together

Labour movement in the United Kingdom

Political funding in the United Kingdom
Labour Party (UK) donors